Georgeta Mincu (born 28 May 1971) is a Moldovan politician. She served as Minister of Agriculture, Regional Development and Environment from 8 June 2019 to 14 November 2019 in the cabinet of Prime Minister Maia Sandu.

References 

Living people
Year of birth missing (living people)
Place of birth missing (living people)
21st-century Moldovan politicians
21st-century Moldovan women politicians
Women government ministers of Moldova